The 8th South American Youth Championships in Athletics were held in Comodoro Rivadavia, Argentina, from October 17–19, 1986.

Medal summary
Medal winners are published for boys and girls. Complete results can be found on the "World Junior Athletics History" website.

Men

Women

Medal table (unofficial)

Participation (unofficial)
Detailed result lists can be found on the "World Junior Athletics History" website.  An unofficial count yields the number of about 205 athletes from about 9 countries:  

 (48)
 (5)
 (38)
 (22)
 (10)
 (18)
 Perú (39)
 (14)
 (11)

References

External links
World Junior Athletics History

South American U18 Championships in Athletics
South Am
South American U18 Championships
International athletics competitions hosted by Argentina
1986 in South American sport